Andile Kwanele Mbanjwa (born 30 March 1998) is a South African professional footballer who plays as a goalkeeper for NFD side Richards Bay and the South Africa U23 national team.

References 

Living people
South African soccer players
Richards Bay F.C. players
National First Division players
1998 births
Association football goalkeepers
2019 Africa U-23 Cup of Nations players